Sedano may refer to:

People 
Andrés Sedano (born 1973), Guatemalan former swimmer who competed in the 1992 Summer Olympics
Paco Sedano (born 1979), Spanish futsal player
Jorge Sedano (born 1977), American sports broadcaster
José Antonio Picón Sedano (born 1988), Spanish footballer

Places 
Sedano y Las Loras, another name for Páramos, a comarca located northwest of the province of Burgos, Castile and León
Valle de Sedano, a municipality located in the province of Burgos, Castile and León

See also
Sedano's, the largest Hispanic-owned supermarket chain in the United States founded by Rene Sedano
Sedona, Arizona, a city that straddles the county line between Coconino and Yavapai counties
Sedan (disambiguation)
Cedano, a Spanish surname